Sex Machine is a 1970 double album by James Brown. It showcases the playing of the original J.B.'s lineup featuring Bootsy and Catfish Collins, and includes an 11-minute rendition of the album's title song, different from the original recording of the title song which was released as a two-part single in 1970.

Sex Machine purports to be a live recording. However, the first LP's worth of material consists of tracks recorded in studio settings with added reverberation and overdubbed applause (some of which subsequently were released in unadulterated mixes, most notably on the 1996 Funk Power compilation CD.). All but one track of the second LP apparently were recorded live in concert in Brown's hometown of Augusta, Georgia, although this material, too, features added reverb and overdubbed applause. It charted #4 R&B and #29 Pop.

Sex Machine is often considered to be one of the greatest and most important funk records of all time, and arguably the high point of Brown's creative heyday from 1967 to 1971. It was ranked 1st in SPIN magazine's 25 greatest albums of all time in 1989, and 96th in a 2005 survey held by British television's Channel 4 to determine the 100 greatest albums of all time. Sex Machine was also voted the 34th greatest album of all time in a VH1 poll of over 700 musicians, songwriters, disc jockeys, radio programmers, and critics in 2003. In Rolling Stones 2020 edition of The 500 Greatest Albums of All Time, it was ranked number 439.

Contents
All tracks on sides one and two and "Lowdown Popcorn" on side three are studio recordings with added reverberation and audience noise. All other tracks on sides three and four were recorded live at the Bell Auditorium in Augusta, GA.

"Brother Rapp" and "Lowdown Popcorn" are the same studio performances initially released as singles. Audience-free studio versions of "Get Up I Feel Like Being a Sex Machine" and "Give It Up or Turnit a Loose" appear on the CD compilation Funk Power 1970: A Brand New Thang, along with a previously unreleased take of "There Was a Time" from the same session. "Mother Popcorn", which was indeed recorded live, appears without added audience noise and with a longer running time on the CD compilation Foundations of Funk: A Brand New Bag 1964-1969. In addition, the album Motherlode includes a live rendition of "Say It Loud - I'm Black and I'm Proud" purportedly from the same Augusta 1969 concert.

Track listing

 Personnel Get Up (I Feel Like Being a) Sex Machine, MedleyJames Brown – vocals, piano (Sex Machine)
Clayton "Chicken" Gunnels – trumpet
Darryl "Hassan" Jamison – trumpet
Robert "Chopper" McCollough – tenor sax
Bobby Byrd – organ, vocals (Sex Machine)
Phelps "Catfish" Collins – guitar
William "Bootsy" Collins – bass
John "Jabo" Starks – drums (Sex Machine)
Clyde Stubblefield – drums (Medley)
Johnny Griggs – congas (Medley)Bell Auditorium, Augusta, GA'''
James Brown – vocals, organ (Spinning Wheel)
Richard "Kush" Griffith – trumpet
Joseph Davis – trumpet
Fred Wesley – trombone
Maceo Parker – tenor sax, organ, emcee
Eldee Williams – tenor sax
St. Clair Pinckney – tenor and baritone sax
Jimmy Nolen – guitar
Alphonso "Country" Kellum – guitar
Sweet Charles Sherrell – bass
Clyde Stubblefield – drums
John "Jabo" Starks – drums
Melvin Parker – drums

References

External links
 Sex Machine'' at Discogs

James Brown albums
James Brown live albums
1970 albums
1970 live albums
King Records (United States) albums